Kahtek or Kahtak may refer to:
 Kahtek, Bandar Abbas
 Kahtek, Minab